N. S. Ramachandran (born 1908) was one of the leading composers of Carnatic music.

References

External links
 

1908 births
Carnatic composers
People from Tamil Nadu
Year of death missing